Altai argali (Ovis ammon ammon) is a traditional subspecies of argali, a wild sheep that roams the highlands of the Altai Mountains in Central Asia.

Altai argali are the largest sheep in the world and also have the heaviest horns. The horns of mature males normally weigh 45 to 50 pounds and up to 75 pounds (35 kg).

References

External links 
 
 

Ovis
Mammals of Central Asia
Mammals of China
Mammals of Russia
Mammals of Mongolia
Mammals described in 1758
Taxa named by Carl Linnaeus